The 1998–99 Nemzeti Bajnokság II is Hungary's second-level football competition. The championship was won by Lombard FC Tatabánya and they were also promoted to the 1999–2000 Nemzeti Bajnokság I along with Nagykanizsa and Szeged LC. Four teams including Salgótarjáni BTC, Tiszavasvári, Soroksár and Soproni FAC were relegated to the 1999–2000 Nemzeti Bajnokság III.

Teams
At the end of 1997-98 season, Nyíregyháza, Dunaferr and III. Kerület promoted to Nemzeti Bajnokság I.

Three teams were relegated to Nemzeti Bajnokság III : Csepel, Dorog and Paks.

The winners and runners-up of the two 1997–98 Nemzeti Bajnokság III series were promoted to NB III: Demecser, Soroksár, Komárom and Tatabánya.

Stadium and locations

Following is the list of clubs competing in 2015–16 Nemzeti Bajnokság II, with their location, stadium and stadium capacity.

League table

Results

See also
 1998–99 Magyar Kupa
 1998–99 Nemzeti Bajnokság I
 1998–99 Nemzeti Bajnokság III

References

External links
 
 

Nemzeti Bajnokság II seasons
1998–99 in Hungarian football
Hun